The 2023 season of the Championship, officially known as the Betfred Championship, is a professional rugby league club competition organised by the Rugby Football League as its second-tier competition. It runs concurrently with its first-tier competition, Super League XXVIII, and its third-tier competition, the 2023 League One season. Fourteen clubs – thirteen from England and one from France – are competing to gain promotion to next year's Super League, while avoiding relegation to the 2024 League One season. British bookmaker Betfred are naming rights sponsors for the competition.

Teams 

In the previous season, the Leigh Centurions were promoted from the Championship to the Super League after defeating the Batley Bulldogs 44–12 in the Championship Grand Final, while the Dewsbury Rams and Workington Town were relegated from the Championship to League One after finishing eleventh and twelfth on the regular season table, respectively. Toulouse Olympique, who are based in the southern French city of Toulouse, return to the Championship after a single season in the Super League, in which they finished in last place and were subsequently relegated to the Championship. Based in the town of Keighley in West Yorkshire, the Keighley Cougars also join the Championship, after finishing their 2022 campaign as champions of the League One regular season, which earned them automatic promotion to the Championship. They last competed in the Championship in 2014. The Swinton Lions from Sale in Greater Manchester also return to the Championship after a single season, winning promotion to the Championship from League One after defeating Doncaster in the League One Play-off Final.

Rule changes
Changes in the operational rules were announced on 1 February 2023. 

On-field, the main change is that teams awarded a penalty for an offence at a scrum can now kick for goal. Previously such penalties were differential precluding the team from kicking for goal. The green card process has been clarified so that if the referee calls "time off" for a player to receive medical attention, the player must leave the pitch for two minutes. Teams will be allowed to name an 18th player (fifth interchange player) in the squad who can play if three or more players are withdrawn due to failing a head injury assessment (HIA). 

Off-field the graduated return to play process that applies after a player has suffered a concussion will be a minimum of 12 days (up from 11 in 2022).

Changes have also been made to the disciplinary process where the periods of suspension for the various grade of offences have been reduced but the use of fines increased.

Results

Regular season table

Broadcasting 
The 2023 Championship season is the second of two seasons to be televised under a broadcasting deal between the Rugby Football League and Premier Media Broadcasting agreed in October 2021. In late 2022, Viaplay Group acquired Premier Media Broadcasting for £30 million, and subsequently took over operations of Premier Media Broadcasting's channels and rebranded them to Viaplay Sports.
Viaplay Group are broadcasting the Championship's Monday evening games, along with two Summer Bash games and all five play-off games, via their Viaplay Sports channels in the United Kingdom and Ireland.

References

External links 
 Betfred Championship at Rugby Football League

RFL Championship
Rugby Football League Championship
Championship